Mandawa Assembly constituency is one of constituencies of Rajasthan Legislative Assembly in the Jhunjhunu (Lok Sabha constituency).

Mandawa Constituency covers all voters from parts of Jhunjhunu tehsil and Malsisar tehisil, which include ILRC Mandawa including Mandawa Municipal Board, ILRC Bissau including Bisau Municipal Board, ILRC Malsisar and ILRC Alsisar.

Election results

References

See also 
 Member of the Legislative Assembly (India)

Jhunjhunu district
Assembly constituencies of Rajasthan